The Adventures of Danny Meadow Mouse (1915) is a children's novel written by Thornton W. Burgess and illustrated by Harrison Cady. The main character also appears in Mr. Toad and Danny Meadow Mouse Take a Walk and Danny Meadow Mouse Learns Something (both 1914).

Plot
Danny begins his tale regretting the length of his tail until he is corrected by Mr. Toad. Then he has a series of stalkings by Reddy and Granny Fox. He is captured by Hooty the Owl and escapes mid-flight to Peter Rabbit's briar patch. Peter goes to Farmer Brown's peach orchard and gets caught in a snare and barely escapes himself. Finally Danny gets trapped in a tin can and must use his wits to escape Reddy Fox again.

External links

 

1915 American novels
1915 children's books
American children's novels
Books about mice and rats
Books about frogs
Little, Brown and Company books